Rosemary Casals and Wendy Turnbull were the defending champions but lost in the semifinals to Billie Jean King and Anne Smith.

King and Smith won in the final 6–3, 1–6, 7–6 against Martina Navratilova and Pam Shriver.

Seeds
Champion seeds are indicated in bold text while text in italics indicates the round in which those seeds were eliminated.

 Martina Navratilova /  Pam Shriver (final)
 Rosemary Casals /  Wendy Turnbull (semifinals)
 Barbara Potter /  Sharon Walsh (semifinals)
 Billie Jean King /  Anne Smith (champions)

Draw

External links
 1983 United Airlines Tournament of Champions Doubles Draw

Doubles